Danger Has Two Faces is a 1985 Hong Kong action film directed by Alex Cheung and starring Bryan Leung, Paul Chu and Fei Xiang. The film is produced and distributed by Shaw Brothers Studio.

Plot
Many years ago, Inspector Kam Chi-kin  or Ah-kam (Bryan Leung) killed an innocent man and decided to resign from the police force. He then became a professional killer, paid by Uncle Hung (Che Hung), and disguises as a pet store owner in order to earn money to raise his son. His best friend, Bobby Chow Fuk-cheung (Fei Xiang) recently returned from UK and works under Superintendent Lau Cheuk-aang (Paul Chu). Chow has been investigating recent murder cases that were done by Ah Kam. Later, as one of his colleague Sam (Kirk Wong) is murdered, Chow discovered the mastermind behind these cases were actually Superintendent Lau. Lau then murders one of his subordinate Man (Cheung Ming-man), mistaken him to have discovered his identity. Later, Uncle Hung takes Kam's son hostage and orders him to kill Chow. Kam later disguises Chow's murder and they both confront Lau, Hung, the gang and two police officers Wai (Chan Chik-wai) and Chicken Blood.

Cast
Bryan Leung as Kam Chi-kin
Paul Chu as Superintendent Lau Cheuk-sang
Carroll Gordon as Jenny
Liu Lai-ling as Ling
Fei Xiang as Inspector Bobby Chow Fuk-cheung
Cheung Ming-man as Man
Kirk Wong as Sergeant Sam Leung
Pamela Peck as pet store customer
Lam Fai-wong as robber
Cheng Kei-ying as robber
Charlie Cho as man impersonating cop
Paul Che as armoured car driver
Pak Sha-lik as man shot by Kam (flashback)
Chan Chik-wai as Wai
Leung Siu-wah as robber
Wong Kim-fung as robber who fights with Bobby
Kam Piu as man outside hotel
Fung Ging Man as man meeting Sergeant Sam
Kei Ho-chiu as robber
Tam Tin-nam as tall man at bus stop
Yuen Ling-to as armoured car guard
Hon Kong as man at police station
Ko Hung as bodyguard
Amy Au as wife of man shot by Kam
Che Hung as Uncle Hung
Fung Ming as man meeting Sergeant Sam
Cheung Kwok-wah as truck driver

Box office
This film grossed HK$4,128,000 during its theatrical run from 31 May to 13 June 1985 in Hong Kong.

External links

Danger Has Two Faces at Hong Kong Cinemagic

1985 films
1980s action thriller films
1980s crime thriller films
Hong Kong action thriller films
Hong Kong crime thriller films
1980s Cantonese-language films
Police detective films
Shaw Brothers Studio films
Films set in Hong Kong
Films shot in Hong Kong
Films about contract killing
1980s Hong Kong films